Christian Jorge Martínez Muñoz (born June 18, 1983) is a Chilean footballer. He is the older brother of Sebastián Martínez, currently Universidad de Chile player.

Honours

Club
Universidad de Chile
 Primera División de Chile (1): 2004 Apertura

External links

1983 births
Living people
Universidad de Chile footballers
Audax Italiano footballers
Chilean footballers
Association football midfielders
Chile international footballers